Muhammad ibn Abbas (Persian: محمد بن عباس) was the king of the Ghurid dynasty. He succeeded his father Abbas ibn Shith in 1060, after the latter was deposed by the Ghaznavid sultan Ibrahim. When Muhammad ascended the throne, he agreed to pay tribute to the Ghaznavids. Not much is known about him, he was succeeded by his son Qutb al-din Hasan.

References

Sources

 

11th-century Iranian people
Ghurid dynasty
1080 deaths
Year of birth missing
11th-century rulers in Asia